Jonas Axel Boeck (16 May 1833 – 6 May 1873) was a Norwegian marine biologist.

Personal life
Axel Boeck was born in 1833 in Aker (now part of Oslo) to Christian Peter Bianco Boeck (1798–1877) and Elisabeth Collett (1806–1883). He was the brother of the jurist Thorvald Boeck. He died just prior to his 40th birthday in Christiania (now Oslo).

Work and legacy
He studied medicine, completing his degree in 1863. Although he was somewhat overshadowed by his successors Georg Ossian Sars and Johan Hjort, Boeck was a pioneer of fisheries science. He was the first Norwegian fisheries scientist, and the country's first herring researcher. In the latter, Boeck attempted to investigate periodicity in herring by examining archival data, and combining scientific and historical approaches.

The copepod genus Boeckella is named in honour of Axel Boeck, as were the species Metopa boeckii, Diastylis boecki, Asterocheres boecki, Pardaliscella boeckii, Amphilochoides boeckii, Sarsameira boecki, Metridia boecki, Parandania boecki, Follicculina boecki and Siphonactinia boeckii.

Award
Crown Prince's Gold Medal (Kronprinsens gullmedalje) in 1860 for a dissertation on the species Gammarus locusta.

References

External links

1833 births
1873 deaths
Scientists from Oslo
University of Oslo alumni
19th-century Norwegian zoologists
Norwegian marine biologists
Norwegian ichthyologists
Norwegian carcinologists
Fisheries scientists